Paraclaravis is a genus that contains two species of doves that live in the Neotropics, with ranges in Middle America and South America. Paraclaravis doves have red eyes and pink legs, and the plumages of the males are primarily light grey-blue, and the females are primarily brown. Both sexes have a series of distinctive spots or bands on the wings. They are fairly arboreal for ground doves. Paraclaravis doves have a distinct fast and rocking flight pattern. They are found alone, in pairs or in small flocks in forests. Both species are generally local and rare, and appears to be associated with flowering bamboo.

The genus contains two species, which were formerly included with the blue ground dove in the genus Claravis:

 Maroon-chested ground dove, Paraclaravis mondetoura
 Purple-winged ground dove, Paraclaravis geoffroyi

References

Paraclaravis
Bird genera